Steven Joseph Lopes (born April 22, 1975) is an American Catholic prelate. He is the bishop of the Personal Ordinariate of the Chair of Saint Peter, a community for clergy and laypeople who celebrate according to the Anglican Use within the Catholic Church.

Early life and education
A native of Fremont, California, Lopes was born on April 22, 1975, the only child of José de Oliveira Lopes and Barbara Jane Lopes. His father was from Portugal and his mother from Poland. He was educated at Catholic schools in California: St. Pius School in Redwood City, St Edward's School in Newark, and Moreau Catholic High School in Hayward.

Lopes studied at the St. Ignatius Institute at the University of San Francisco, and also pursued studies at the University of Innsbruck in Austria. His philosophical studies and preparation for the priesthood took place at St. Patrick’s Seminary in Menlo Park, California, before he was assigned to study theology in Rome. There he obtained a licentiate at the Pontifical Gregorian University while living at the Pontifical North American College.

Ordained ministry
Lopes was ordained to the diaconate on October 5, 2000, during a Mass at St. Peter's Basilica, Rome. He was ordained a priest on June 23, 2001, for the Archdiocese of San Francisco by William Levada. He served in two parishes in California as an associate pastor; St. Patrick's Catholic Church, San Francisco, and St. Anselm Catholic Church in Ross, California.

Lopes returned to Rome to obtain a doctorate in sacred theology from the Gregorian University. Since 2005, he has served as an official of the Holy See's Congregation for the Doctrine of the Faith, while also serving as a professor of theology at the Gregorian. During that time, he served as a personal aide to William Cardinal Levada, who was prefect for the Congregation of the Doctrine of the Faith from 2005 to 2012. On July 10, 2010, he was appointed a Chaplain of His Holiness and therefore was then addressed as "Monsignor". Starting in 2012, Lopes served as the secretary of the Vatican commission Anglicanae Traditiones, which was formed with the goal of developing a missal that would blend Anglican and Roman Rite liturgical elements for the use of the personal ordinariates.

Episcopal ministry 

On November 24, 2015, the Holy See announced that Pope Francis had appointed Lopes as the first bishop of the Personal Ordinariate of the Chair of Saint Peter, a church structure for Catholics in the US and Canada who were formerly Anglicans. This announcement coincided with the first Sunday on which the ordinariates began celebrating Mass using Divine Worship: The Missal, developed while Lopes was serving on the Anglicanae Traditiones commission in Rome. As ordinary, Lopes succeeded Jeffrey N. Steenson, a former Episcopal bishop appointed by Pope Benedict XVI in 2012. On February 2, 2016, he was consecrated a bishop in Houston and took canonical possession of the ordinariate. Lopes is the first bishop to lead any of the three ordinariates. In November 2021, he was elected chairman of the USCCB's Committee on Divine Worship.

References

External links

Steven J. Lopes at Catholic Hierarchy website
Bishop Stephen J. Lopes at Ordinariate.net

See also

1975 births
Living people
American people of Portuguese descent
American people of Polish descent
People from Fremont, California
21st-century Roman Catholic bishops in the United States
People of the personal ordinariates
Roman Catholic Archdiocese of San Francisco
Pontifical North American College alumni
Academic staff of the Pontifical Gregorian University
University of San Francisco alumni
University of Innsbruck alumni
Catholics from California
Bishops appointed by Pope Francis